"Party to Damascus" is a reggae fusion and hip hop song by Haitian rapper Wyclef Jean featuring guest vocals from Missy Elliott. It was written by Jean, Elliott, and Jerry Duplessis for his fourth studio album, The Preacher's Son (2003). Released as the album's lead single, it peaked at #65 on the Billboard Hot 100, #34 on the Hot R&B/Hip-Hop Songs Chart, #49 on the Swedish Singles Chart and #20 on the Norwegian Singles Chart. In Europe, the song was released as a double A-side with "Industry", a song which charted at #73 on the U.S. R&B chart due to strong downloads.

Track listing
 UK CD Single (82876 568222)
 "Party to Damascus" - 4:03
 "Party to Damascus" (Radio Edit - No Intro) - 3:45
 "Party to Damascus" (Instrumental) - 4:03

 European CD Single
 "Party to Damascus" - 4:03
 "Industry" - 3:02
 "Industry" (Reggae Version Featuring Trial) - 3:26
 "Industry" (Video) - 3:42

Charts

Weekly charts

References

2003 singles
Wyclef Jean songs
Missy Elliott songs
Songs written by Wyclef Jean
Songs written by Missy Elliott
Songs written by Jerry Duplessis
Song recordings produced by Jerry Duplessis
Song recordings produced by Wyclef Jean